Belokamenka was a VLCC, latterly used as an FSO (Floating Storage and Offloading) vessel, located off Singapore, and prior to 2015, at Kola Bay near Murmansk. Belokamenka was scrapped in April 2019.

History
Belokamenka was originally built by Mitsui Eng. & Shipbuilding Co.,Ltd., Chiba Works, on 1980. Its name was Berge Pioneer until 2004.

Technical features
It handled four million tonnes of crude oil per year, shipped in by small shuttle tankers from Arkhangelsk.

Operator
Belokamenka was chartered by Rosnefteflot, a subsidiary of Rosneft, on a long-term basis. It was operated by the Oil Terminal "Belokamenka" L.L.C.

References

External links
Images

Floating production storage and offloading vessels
Service vessels of Russia
Oil tankers
Rosneft
1980 ships
Ships built by Mitsui Engineering and Shipbuilding